Brenda Navarro (born 26 February 1982) is a Mexican writer, sociologist, and economist. She researches and writes about women’s labour, women’s access to culture, digital rights and humanities, and migration. Her novel Empty Houses won the English Pen Translation Award in 2019.

Biography 

Navarro was born in Mexico City in 1982. She studied sociology and economy at the National Autonomous University of Mexico. She then went on to study a Master's degree on gender and citizenship at the University of Barcelona. She currently resides in Madrid.

In 2016 she founded #EnjambreLiterario, a group of writers who promote writing by women. 

Her debut novel Empty Houses was translated from Spanish by Sophie Hughes and won the English Pen Translation Award in 2019. It is set against the backdrop of Mexico’s war on drugs. Her second novel Ceniza en la boca (Ash in the Mouth) was released in spring 2022. It focuses on Ulysses syndrome – a chronic stress disorder that affects immigrants.

Awards 
 Premio Tigre Juan (2020)
 English Pen Translation Award (2019)

Bibliography

Novels 
 Empty Houses (2018)
 Ceniza en la boca / Ash in the Mouth (2022)

Short stories 
 El asalto a Raúl Castro (2011)
 La cobija azul (2013)
 Jauría de perros (2015)

Essay 
 La construcción de redes, una respuesta antes las políticas migratorias de Estados Unidos (2018)

Poetry 

 4 diatribas y media en la Ciudad de México (2020)

References

1982 births
Living people
Mexican feminists
Writers from Mexico City
Feminist writers
Mexican women novelists
21st-century Mexican women writers
21st-century Mexican novelists